Hurník can refer to

 Ilja Hurník (1922–2013), a Czech composer
 Lukáš Hurník (born 1967), a Czech composer
 16929 Hurník, an asteroid named after Ilja Hurník.
Czech-language surnames